United Nations Security Council Resolution 225, adopted unanimously on October 14, 1966, after examining the application of Lesotho for membership in the United Nations, the Council recommended to the General Assembly that Lesotho be admitted.

See also
List of United Nations Security Council Resolutions 201 to 300 (1965–1971)

References
Text of the Resolution at undocs.org

External links
 

 0225
 0225
 0225
October 1966 events